J.S. University is a private university established in 2015 by Sri Jagdish Jan Kalyan Educational Trust at Shikohabad of Firozabad district, Uttar Pradesh, India. It was established by Uttar Pradesh act no.7 of 2015 and recognised by University Grants Commission (India) under section 12(f) of its act.

Location
The University campus is located at Mainpuri Road, Shikohabad.

References

External links
Official website
University act

Private universities in Uttar Pradesh
Shikohabad
Educational institutions established in 2015
2015 establishments in Uttar Pradesh